Crystal River High School was built in Crystal River, Florida, in 1969. It was the second of the high schools located in Citrus County. The first enrollment count was 750 students. As of 2022, it is rated #3 out of 5 in Crystal River.

The school serves the following communities: Crystal River, Homosassa, and sections of Black Diamond, Citrus Springs, Homosassa Springs, Pine Ridge, and Sugarmill Woods.

Reconstruction

In 2010, the school began a major renovation of its facilities.  The first phase included a new baseball field, a new administration building with classrooms, as well as a second classroom building, both of which were constructed on the school's original baseball field.  This phase of construction also included the demolition of the school's original classroom building from 1969.  Phase 1 of construction was completed in August 2011.

The second phase of construction, which began shortly after the first completed, included a new Media Center, a third classroom building housing a Freshman Academy, renovations to the old Administration building to house the school's Health Academy, demolition of half of the school's other classroom building, and expansion of the school's cafeteria. As of 2022, construction has been finished for an unknown amount of time.

Spirit
 Motto: Make footprints with your heart.
 Mascot: Pete the Pirate.
 School colors: Royal blue and gold.
 Clubs: Crystal River has approximately 36 clubs and activities (not including sports).
 School store: Scallywags (Opened as of spring 2006).
 Rivalry: Lecanto High School 
2000-2001: The "Victory Bell" (once located in the high school courtyard and used to celebrate athletic victories) goes missing before the beginning of school in August. Although Citrus High School students had relocated the bell many times in the past as a prank, the bell had always been discovered; the bell was found this time at the Citrus football field. "C.H.S. Rules" was written in the sand next to where the bell had once lived.

2003-2004: Citrus High School students climbed the fence of Crystal River High School the night before homecoming. They were dressed in camouflage, and they were armed with paintball guns. Their goal was to paintball the school floats that would be used for the homecoming parade. MTV later became aware of the prank, and the Citrus High School students (along with the participation of some Crystal River High School students) reenacted the nights events. It was aired on MTV's High School Stories.

Affiliations
College of Central Florida allows for students to participate in Dual Enrollment: a program that allows students, though still in high school, to get college credits (some of the classes are currently offered on campus). These include ENC1101, ENC 1102, Biology, and Calculus.
 Other programs include the Advanced Placement courses which allow students to go through a course in preparation for the AP Test which, if passed, gives the student college credit for the course. The school offers after school tutoring and has a mentoring program with the community.

Notable alumni 

 Will Bleakley
 Jeff Cunningham – American soccer player who formerly played for the Columbus Crew in Major League Soccer, as well as the United States men's national soccer team
 Donnie Dewees – An American professional baseball outfielder for the Chicago Cubs
 Mike Hampton – Former Major League Baseball pitcher
 Fred McKinnon – Former college basketball standout

References

External links
 CRHS home page

1969 establishments in Florida
Crystal River, Florida
Educational institutions established in 1969
High schools in Citrus County, Florida
Public high schools in Florida